is a district of Ichikawa, Chiba, Japan.

References

Neighbourhoods in Japan
Ichikawa, Chiba